Anant English School is a co-educational private school located in Anant Chowk of Siddhipur, Mahalaxmi municipality, in the district of Lalitpur. It is a secondary school affiliated with NEB Board and PABSON. The school was established in 2048 BS. It has approximately 500 students.

History
The school was founded by principal Gopal Prasad Ghimire, Mahanta Bahadur Maharjan and other intellectuals in 1992. The school celebrated its silver jubilee on 2017 March 4 with the slogan “25 years of Quality Education Service” The school began its educational journey as a primary school with 75 students. At present it has more than 500 students. There are 37 teaching and non-teaching staff.

With earthquakes not uncommon in the area, the buildings have been constructed to withstand tremors.

Yearbook 

The school publishes Anant Batika (Nepali: अनन्त बाटिका ) as its yearbook. On the 25th anniversary of school, school published a silver jubilee special bulletin.

Curriculum
The school follows curriculum prescribed by Curriculum Development Centre. The primary languages of instruction are English and Nepali.

Houses
The student population is divided into four houses: Blue, Green, Red and White. Each house has a house teacher, house captain and house vice-captain.

See also
 Mount Olive English Secondary School
 Kopila English Secondary School
 List of schools in Nepal

External links
 Anant English School - Official Facebook Page 
 Anant Students Group

References

Secondary schools in Nepal
Schools in Nepal
Lalitpur District, Nepal